"Pink Cadillac" is a song by Bruce Springsteen released as the non-album B-side of "Dancing in the Dark" in 1984. The song received moderate airplay on album-oriented rock radio and appeared on the Billboard Top Tracks chart for 14 weeks, peaking at No. 27. The song was also a prominent concert number during Springsteen's Born in the U.S.A. Tour.

The song follows Prince's "Little Red Corvette" and Wilson Pickett's "Mustang Sally" in using automobile travel as a metaphor for sexual activity, in particular the lyric "I love you for your pink Cadillac", which was intended to be a veiled reference to a vagina. Springsteen, in fact, vetoed the first attempt by a female singer to release a version of "Pink Cadillac", that being Bette Midler in 1983. However, "Pink Cadillac" had its highest profile incarnation via an R&B interpretation by Natalie Cole, which became a top-ten single in 1988.

Bruce Springsteen version

Background
Springsteen originally wrote "Pink Cadillac" as "Love Is a Dangerous Thing" in December 1981; this version was lyrically distinct from the eventual "Pink Cadillac" except for the line "Eve tempted Adam with an apple", which Springsteen decided to make the basis for a more lighthearted lyric. The first lyrics Springsteen wrote for "Pink Cadillac" were: "They say Eve tempted Adam with an apple but man I ain't going for that/ I know it was her pink Cadillac". The auto imagery was inspired by Elvis Presley's 1954 rendition of "Baby Let's Play House" in which Presley replaced the original lyric: "You may get religion" with: "You may have a pink Cadillac", a reference to the custom painted Cadillac that was then Presley's touring vehicle.

Recording

First recorded by Springsteen in an acoustic version in early January 1982 in the session whose tracks would comprise the Nebraska album, "Pink Cadillac" was not formally recorded by Springsteen until the sessions for his Born in the U.S.A. album, in the spring of 1983. At the end of one session, when most of the crew had left the studio, Springsteen impulsively cut a basic track of him singing "Pink Cadillac" to his guitar accompaniment; this track was completed with the E Street Band the following morning. Although not included on the completed Born in the U.S.A. album, being bumped from the track list that April in favor of "I'm Goin' Down", "Pink Cadillac" was released in 1984 as the B-side of the album's lead single, "Dancing in the Dark".

The track would appear as one of two songs (along with "Cover Me") on a CD3 released in 1988, but was not included on any Springsteen album until Tracks in 1998, and 18 Tracks in 1999, both these titles being anthologies of Springsteen's outtakes-and-B-sides.

Springsteen's version of "Pink Cadillac" is often compared to the Peter Gunn theme by Henry Mancini, which it resembles in its main riff and saxophone break.

In 2006, Springsteen appeared on a recording of "Pink Cadillac" by Jerry Lee Lewis on his album Last Man Standing.

In concert
Performing the song live, Springsteen explained the song as being "about the conflict between worldly things and spiritual health, between desires of the flesh and spiritual ecstasy," in a long tongue-in-cheek spoken introduction.

Springsteen performed the song at a concert in Turku, Finland, on May 7, 2013. The song was requested by fans and chosen by Springsteen as part of a tradition where Springsteen collects signs suggesting songs to be played from fans in the front rows and then chooses a few of those songs (not otherwise on the setlist) to be played.

Personnel
According to authors Philippe Margotin and Jean-Michel Guesdon:

Bruce Springsteen – vocals, guitar
Clarence Clemons – saxophone
Garry Tallent – bass
Max Weinberg – drums

Natalie Cole version

In mid 1987, Natalie Cole recorded "Pink Cadillac" at the suggestion of producer Dennis Lambert; Cole recalls: "I thought to myself, 'I'm too old to be doing this kind of stuff', but then I'd never worked with anyone quite like Dennis before. He was very passionate about his work [and] his enthusiasm gave me the confidence that I could pull [the song] off." The track was intended for an album release on the Modern label; that project was canceled and Cole's "Pink Cadillac" and another Lambert production: "I Live For Your Love", were picked up by EMI-Manhattan Records to appear on Cole's 1987 album Everlasting. 

"Pink Cadillac" was released as that album's third single in March 1988. In May 1988, the song reached number 5 on the Billboard Hot 100, matching Cole's previous best with "I've Got Love on My Mind" and becoming her first top ten hit since 1978. "Pink Cadillac" also reached number 9 on the R&B chart, number 16 on the A/C chart and, via a remix by David Cole (no relation) and Robert Clivilles, number one on Billboard Hot Dance Club Play chart. It became her first top ten hit in the United Kingdom by reaching number five on the UK Singles Chart, her first top forty hit there since 1978. 

According to Cole, "word got back" to her that Springsteen "thought it was very cool that a woman could [sing "Pink Cadillac"] and it would come out so great". (Springsteen had vetoed a 1983 release of Bette Midler's version of the song as gender-inappropriate, as detailed below.)  The song was played on the 7836th episode of the American daytime television soap opera General Hospital on November 11, 1993, during a scene when Luke and Laura were in a pink Cadillac car on their way to GH.

The music video was directed by Maurice Phillips.

Charts

Weekly charts

Year-end charts

Certifications

Jerry Lee Lewis version

Jerry Lee Lewis covered the song on his 2006 album Last Man Standing with additional vocals by Springsteen himself. The single was released in 2006 on country music stations in the United States. The computer-animated music video premiered on CMT in November 2006.

Other versions

Bette Midler added "Pink Cadillac" to the set list for her 1982-83 De Tour tour and recorded the song for inclusion on her 1983 No Frills album; however, Springsteen blocked the release of Midler's version on the grounds that "Pink Cadillac" was not a "girl's song". According to the Midler biography Still Divine by Mark Bego, Midler was severely disappointed by Springsteen's veto, which forced her to record a new track ("Beast of Burden") for No Frills at considerable expense. Midler's August 1984 video release Art or Bust video - comprising footage from the two De Tour concerts at the University of Minnesota - included "Pink Cadillac" as the opening number.

Aretha Franklin is sometimes mis-credited as a singer of "Pink Cadillac" as the imagery occurs in her 1985 comeback hit "Freeway of Love" with the same metaphoric sense as in the Springsteen original, the lyric being: "We're going riding on the freeway of love in my pink Cadillac".

"Pink Cadillac" has long been a staple of Melissa Etheridge's live repertoire; at a 2 October 1996 Milwaukee concert by Etheridge, Springsteen joined her onstage to close the show with a duet of "Pink Cadillac". Etheridge has never recorded "Pink Cadillac", although her live performance is widely available as a bootleg recording.

Carl Perkins recorded a version of "Pink Cadillac" on his album Friends, Family & Legends of 1992.

Southern Pacific released a version on their 1986 album, Killbilly Hill.

Brian Conley recorded "Pink Cadillac" for his 1993 Brian Conley Sings album.

The 2003 album Light of Day: A Tribute to Bruce Springsteen includes a rendition of "Pink Cadillac" by Graham Parker.

It appeared on the 2004 album Live in Asbury Park, Vol. 2 by Clarence Clemons and Temple of Soul.

Bobby Mackey released it as a single in 2011.

Grace Gaustad released a cover in February of 2022.

References

Further reading
 Marsh, Dave. Glory Days: Bruce Springsteen in the 1980s. Pantheon Books, 1987. .
 Bruce-base recording sessions history

1984 songs
1988 singles
Bruce Springsteen songs
Bette Midler songs
Natalie Cole songs
Songs about cars
Song recordings produced by Jon Landau
Songs written by Bruce Springsteen
Columbia Records singles
EMI Records singles
Manhattan Records singles
Song recordings produced by Bruce Springsteen
Song recordings produced by Steven Van Zandt
Song recordings produced by Chuck Plotkin